Yulia (Юлия) is a female given name, the equivalent of the Latin Julia. It can be spelled Yulia, Yulya, Julia, Julja, Julija, Yuliia, Yuliya, Juliya or İulia. An alternative spelling is Ioulia/Gioulia (Greek) or Iuliia. Prononciations can differ, depending on where you are from. The name can be found in many countries, especially in Christian ones. (example: Germany, Bulgaria, Spain, Greece, Russia, Ukraine, Belarus, Italy etc) The name is of a Christian origin as well - Saint Julia of Corsica.
A few notable people from some of the countries in which the name exist are shown below.

People

Yulia

Yulia Barsukova (born 1978), Russian rhythmic gymnast
Yulia Beygelzimer (born 1983), Ukrainian tennis player
Yulia Efimova (born 1992), Russian swimmer
Yulia Fedossova (born 1988), French tennis player born in Novosibirsk, Russia
Yulia Glushko (born 1990), Israeli tennis player
Yulia Latynina (born 1966), Russian writer and journalist
Yulia Livinskaya (born 1990), Russian freestyle skier
Yulia Lipnitskaya (born 1998), Russian figure skater
Yulia MacLean (stage name Yulia, born 1986), New Zealand singer
Yulia Paevska (born 1968), Ukrainian paramedic
Yulia Raskina (born 1982), Belarusian rhythmic gymnast
Yulia Sachkov (born 1999), Israeli world champion kickboxer
Yulia Savicheva (born 1987), Russian singer
Yulia Shevchuk (born 1998), Ukrainian footballer
Yulia Sister (born 1936), Israeli chemist
Yulia Tolopa (born 1995), Russian-born Ukrainian soldier
Yulia Tymoshenko (born 1960), former Prime Minister of Ukraine.
Yulia Volkova (born 1985), ex member of the Russian pop group t.A.T.u.
Yulia Zagoruychenko (born 1981), Russian-American latin dancer
Yulia Putintseva (born 1995), Kazakhstan Tennis player

Yuliya

Yuliya Andriychuk (born 1992), Ukrainian handball player
Yuliya Antipova (born 1966), Soviet luger
Yuliya Baraley (born 1990), Ukrainian sprinter
Yuliya Barysik (born 1984), Belarusian judoka
Yuliya Beygelzimer (born 1983); Ukrainian tennis player
Yuliya Bichyk (born 1983), Belarusian rower
Yuliya Biryukova (born 1985), Russian foil fencer
Yuliya Blahinya (born 1990), Ukrainian wrestler
Yuliya Borisova (born 1925), Soviet Russian actress
Yuliya Chekaleva (born 1984), Russian cross-country skier
Yuliya Chepalova (born 1976), Russian cross-country skier
Yuliya Chermoshanskaya (born 1986), Russian track and field athlete
Yuliya Dovhal (born 1983), Ukrainian weightlifter
Yuliya Drishlyuk (born 1975), Kazakh sports shooter
Yuliya Fomenko (runner) (born 1979), Russian middle-distance runner
Yuliya Fomenko (swimmer) (born 1981), Russian backstroke swimmer
Yuliya Gavrilova (born 1989), Russian sabre fencer
Yuliya Gippenreyter (born 1930), Russian psychologist
Yuliya Golubchikova (born 1983), Russian pole vaulter
Yuliya Graudyn (born 1970), Russian hurdler
Yuliya Gushchina (born 1983), Russian sprinter
Yuliya Kalina (born 1988), Ukrainian weightlifter
Yuliya Khitraya (born 1989), Belarusian swimmer
Yuliya Kondakova (born 1981), Russian hurdler
Yuliya Kosenkova (born 1973), Russian middle-distance runner
Yuliya Krevsun (born 1980), Ukrainian middle-distance runner
Yuliya Leantsiuk (born 1984), Belarusian shot putter
Yuliya Levina (born 1973), Russian rower
Yuliya Liteykina (born 1977), Russian speed skater
Yuliya Lyakhova (born 1977), Russian high jumper
Yuliya Maltseva (born 1990), Russian disc thrower
Yuliya Martisova (born 1976), Russian road cyclist
Yuliya Mayarchuk, Ukrainian-born actress
Yuliya Olishevska (born 1989), Ukrainian athlete
Yuliya Pakhalina, Russian diver
Yuliya Pechonkina (born 1978); Russian athlete
Yuliya Pidlisna (born 1987), Ukrainian swimmer
Yuliya Platonova (1841–1892), Russian operatic soprano
Yuliya Rakhmanova (born 1991), Kazakh sprinter
Yuliya Pidluzhnaya (born 1988), Russian long jumper
Yuliya Ratkevich (born 1985), Belarus-Azerbaijani wrestler
Yuliya Saltsevich (born 1967), Russian volleyball player and coach
Yuliya Shamshurina (born 1962), Soviet cross-country skier
Yuliya Shiryayeva (born 1994), Kazakhstani footballer
Yuliya Skokova (born 1982), Russian speed skater
Yuliya Snigir (born 1983), Russian actress and model
Yuliya Snopova (born 1985), Ukrainian handball player
Yuliya Solntseva (1901–1989), Soviet film director and actress
Yuliya Sotnikova (born 1970), Russian sprinter
Yuliya Tabakova (born 1980), Russian sprinter
Yuliya Tarasenko (gymnast)  (born 1985), Belarusian gymnast
Yuliya Tarasenko (orienteer) (born 1984), Russian ski orienteering competitor
Yuliya Tarasova (born 1986), Uzbek heptathlete and long jumper
Yuliya Tkach (born 1989), Ukrainian freestyle wrestler
Yuliya Vetlova (born 1983), Russian luger
Yuliya Veysberg (1880–1942), Russian music critic and composer
Yuliya Voyevodina (born 1971), Russian race walker
Yuliya Yefimova (born 1992), Russian swimmer
Yuliya Yelistratova (born 1988), Ukrainian triathlete
Yuliya Zaripova (born 1989), Russian middle-distance athlete
Yuliya Zhivitsa (born 1990), Kazakh sabre fencer

Juliya
Juliya Chernetsky (born 1982), American television personality

Fictional characters
Yulia (Night Watch), a young sorceress in the Night Watch books

See also
Julia, given name
Julija, given name
Iulia (disambiguation), including the given name

Russian feminine given names
Ukrainian feminine given names